In Jin Moon (or Tatiana Moon) is the former president of the Unification Church of the United States and a daughter of Unification Church founder Reverend Sun Myung Moon and his wife Hak Ja Han.  Moon was born in South Korea in 1965 and moved with her family to the United States in 1973. She studied political science and philosophy at Columbia University and pursued her graduate studies at Harvard Divinity School.  In the 1980s, Moon spoke at public rallies in support of her father who was convicted of tax fraud by the United States government.

In 2008 Moon assumed the position of CEO at New York City's Manhattan Center, and implemented a restructuring. She was appointed president of the HSA-UWC America in August 2008 and worked to modernize the church's worship style in an effort to bring in younger members.  In 2011, she spoke at an inter-religious conference on religious freedom in Washington DC.  In 2012 she resigned from her office following her divorce and remarriage.

References

Living people
Columbia College (New York) alumni
Harvard Divinity School alumni
American Unificationists
American women chief executives
South Korean emigrants to the United States
Year of birth missing (living people)
21st-century American women